Loose Connections is a 1984 British film starring Stephen Rea.

Plot
A feminist travels through Europe with a male chauvinist.

Cast
Stephen Rea as Harry
Lindsay Duncan as Sally
Jan Niklas as Axel
Carole Harrison as Kaya
Gary Olsen as Kevin
Frances Low as Larie
Ken Jones

Production
Three quarters of the budget came from the NFFC with the rest coming from Virgin Films.

Release
The film was not released in New York until 1988. The New York Times said "Nothing happens in Loose Connections that isn't announced ahead of time, but the movie is very decently acted by Mr. Rea and especially by Miss Duncan... The film... is bright, articulate, gentle and completely unsurprising."

References

External links

1984 films
British romantic comedy films
1984 romantic comedy films
Films directed by Richard Eyre
1980s English-language films
1980s British films